Titanio caradjae is a moth in the family Crambidae. It was described by Rebel in 1902. It is found in Turkey.

References

Moths described in 1902
Odontiini
Taxa named by Hans Rebel
Insects of Turkey